Agnesar saga is an Old Norse-Icelandic saints' saga that recounts the legend of St Agnes of Rome. It survives in three versions, all based on Pseudo-Ambrose's passion, BHL156. Agnesar saga I omits the epilogue and is somewhat abridged. It follows the source text more closely than Agnesar saga II. Agnesar saga III is significantly abridged and is different from the first two versions.

Background

Agnes's feast day of 21 January was adopted as Holy Day of Obligation in Iceland in 1179 under Þorlákr Þórhallsson. This was prompted by a vision of St Agnes which appeared to Guðmundr kárhöfði.

There was an image of St Agnes at the Kirkjubær convent dating to the second half of the fourteenth century. The nun Jórunn Hauksdóttir of Kirkjubær took the name Agnes in 1344 when she became abbess. Agnesar saga I is preserved in Kirkjubæjarbók (AM 429 12mo), a codex containing lives of female saints kept at the convent.

Agnes also appears in three medieval and early modern Icelandic poems and in a set of four rímur: Agnesardiktur (ca. 1300-1550); Rímur af Agnesi píslarvotti, composed by Eiríkur Hallsson (1614-1698); Agnesarkvæði (ca. 1725), attributed to Þorvaldur Magnússon; Heilagra meyja drápa, stanzas 30-32 (14th century).

Bibliography 
A comprehensive bibliography can be found in Wolf's The Legends of the Saints in Old Norse-Icelandic Prose.

Agnesar saga I

Manuscripts 

 AM 235 fol. - ca. 1400
 AM 238 fol. I - ca. 1300
 AM 238 fol. II - ca. 1300-1350
 AM 429 12mo (Kirkjubæjarbók) - ca. 1500

Editions 

 
 
 
 
  [Modern Icelandic edition]

Agnesar saga II

Manuscript 

 AM 233a fol. - ca. 1350-1375

Edition

Agnesar saga III

Manuscript 

 AM 238 fol. - ca. 1450-1500

Edition

References 

Sagas of saints